The Combined Military Services Museum in Maldon, Essex, was opened on 5 July 2004. It was set up by Richard Wooldridge to house a personal collection he had created over many years. A charity was established in 1996 to facilitate the funding of a museum building. A suitable property was found in 2001, a former bonded warehouse in Maldon. This underwent considerable modification to suit its new purpose. In the period of setting up the museum, the initial collection was expanded by donations and acquisitions. In 2007, a National Lottery grant was given to extend the museum to house the Donnington Historic Weapons Collection. These works were completed in November 2008.

Amongst the items in the museum is a Cockle Mark II canoe from the "cockleshell heroes" raid, Operation Frankton, as well as a large collection  of Special Operations Executive (SOE) equipment and the Donnington Historic Weapons Collection. The Donnington collection also holds a replica of the Victoria Cross metal, a piece of bronze from a captured cannon from which all Victoria Crosses have been made. The original metal is still closely guarded within MoD Donnington. Amongst the rarest items in the museum  are the Riggal Papers. These are the training records of Captain P M Riggal, an instructor in the SOE, found 50 years after the end of the Second World War.

On 7 September 2016, nearly 100 artefacts from the museum's SOE and Mason collections were shipped to the Musée de l'Armée in Paris for an exhibition called "Guerres Secretes" ("Secret Wars"), to run from 12 October 2016 and to 29 January 2017.

References

External links
 Combined Military Services Museum website
 Musee de l'Armée - Guerres Secretes Secret Wars

Maldon, Essex
Museums in Essex
Military and war museums in England